This is a list of tourist attractions in Riga, the capital of Latvia.

Old town
 The Lutheran cathedral - the largest church in the Baltic states. Built in the 13th century, it was modified several times in its history. It has a magnificent organ that dates from 1844.
 Riga Museum of History and Navigation (Rīgas vēstures un kuģniecības muzejs) - one of the largest and oldest museums in Latvia and Baltic states.
 The Powder Tower (Pulvertornis) - the only tower that remains from the original city walls; the Latvian Museum of War is located inside.
 Riga Castle (Rīgas Pils) -  houses the Museum of Latvian History and the Museum of Foreign Art, and the president's official residence
 St James's Roman Catholic cathedral.
 St. John's Church - a small 13th-century chapel, behind Saint Peter's Church.
 Saint Peter's Church - with its  tower.

The centre

 Art Nouveau architecture
 National Library of Latvia (Latvijas Nacionālā bibliotēka) - the latest project of Gunārs Birkerts, called the Castle of Light (Gaismas pils).
 Riga Circus (Rīgas cirks) - the only permanently situated circus in the Baltic States.
 Vērmane Garden (Vērmanes dārzs) - the oldest public garden in Riga.
 Wooden architecture.

Other parts of the city
 The Ethnographic Open-Air Museum of Latvia (Latvijas Etnogrāfiskais brīvdabas muzejs) - an open-air museum displaying houses, farm buildings, and a church, representing rural life going back hundreds of years; situated along Jugla Lake.
 The Museum of the Occupation of Latvia (Latvijas Okupācijas muzejs) - documents the seizure and occupation of Latvia by various invaders from 1940 to 1991.
 Riga Motor Museum (Rīgas motormuzejs) - a collection of retro motorcycles and automobiles, including some of the first motorcycles and remnants of the Soviet era, for example, Brezhnev's and Stalin's armoured limousines with waxworks of these political figures; located in Mežciems.
 Riga Radio and TV Tower - the third highest tower in Europe.
 Riga Zoo and Mežaparks - with a Ferris wheel.

References

Riga
Riga